Benjamin Fuchs (born 20 October 1983) is an Austrian former professional footballer who played as a right-back. He also holds German citizenship.

Career
Fuchs started his senior career with Greuther Fürth, making his professional debut during the 2005–06 2. Bundesliga season. After the season, he joined Regionalliga side SV Wehen for one year, before signing with Eintracht Braunschweig in 2007. After spending four seasons with Braunschweig in the 3rd tier of German football, both Fuchs and the club made it back into the 2. Bundesliga for 2011–12. At the end of the season, his contract with Eintracht Braunschweig was not extended and Fuchs went on to join Manisaspor in the Turkish TFF First League. In 2014, Fuchs transferred to Süper Lig side Torku Konyaspor.

Personal life
His mother is Turkish and his father is Austrian.

References

External links
 

1983 births
Living people
Austrian people of Turkish descent
German people of Austrian descent
Footballers from Nuremberg
Austrian footballers
German footballers
Association football fullbacks
Austria youth international footballers
2. Bundesliga players
3. Liga players
Süper Lig players
TFF First League players
TFF Second League players
Eintracht Braunschweig players
Eintracht Braunschweig II players
SpVgg Greuther Fürth players
SV Wehen Wiesbaden players
Manisaspor footballers
Konyaspor footballers
Göztepe S.K. footballers
Gaziantep F.K. footballers
Gümüşhanespor footballers
Fatih Karagümrük S.K. footballers
Austrian expatriate footballers
German expatriate footballers
Austrian expatriate sportspeople in Turkey
German expatriate sportspeople in Turkey
Expatriate footballers in Turkey